Eau Claire Town Hall and Survey Publishing Company Building is a building that was built for the Survey Publishing Company. Later it was the Eau Claire Town Hall. In 1979, it was named to the National Register of Historic Places in 1979.

History
The building was started in 1912 and completed in 1914. It was first occupied by the Survey Publishing Company that published the American Lutheran Survey. The editor was Walton H. Greever, who was also a faculty member at the nearby Lutheran seminary. After the Survey folded, the building became the Eau Claire Town Hall from 1928 to 1955. In 1955, Eau Claire merged with the City of Columbia.

Architecture
The building was designed by J. Carroll Johnson of Urquhart and Johnson in Columbia. The building is a two-story brick building with asymmetrical plan. It is decorated with tile and decorative concrete. It features a four-story tower on the southeast corner. There is also a one-story, brick building that was used for the printing plant.

References

Industrial buildings and structures on the National Register of Historic Places in South Carolina
City and town halls on the National Register of Historic Places in South Carolina
Buildings designated early commercial in the National Register of Historic Places
Buildings and structures completed in 1914
Buildings and structures in Columbia, South Carolina
National Register of Historic Places in Columbia, South Carolina
City and town halls in South Carolina